Itoshino Half Moon is a 1987 Japanese film directed by Yōjirō Takita. Based on a novel by actress Mieko Harada, screenwriter Hiroshi Saito won the "Best Screenplay" award at the Yokohama Film Festival for this film.

Cast
 Maiko Itō: Yoko Sugino 
 Ken Ishiguro: Osamu Yokoyama 
 Shinobu Horie: Reiko Sugino 
 Daisuke Shima: Hirokazu Ishida 
 Yukijirō Hotaru: Man at 'Yu-chan' 
 Yutaka Ikejima: Bar owner 
 Midori Satsuki: Satoko Sugino 
 Susumu Terajima: Hooligan 
 Takashi Tsumura: Yusuke Taki 
 Sakae Umezu: Yamahiko Sugino

References

Bibliography
  
 
 

1987 films
1980s Japanese-language films
Films directed by Yōjirō Takita
Nikkatsu films
Nikkatsu Roman Porno
Japanese pornographic films
1980s Japanese films